Zoltan Sepeshy (1898–1974) was a Hungarian-born American painter. He was trained in Budapest and Vienna, and he emigrated to the United States in 1921. He taught at the Cranbrook Academy of Art in Bloomfield Hills, Michigan, and he was its second director. His work is in the permanent collections of the Smithsonian American Art Museum and the Cranbrook Art Museum.

References

1898 births
1974 deaths
Artists from Košice
People from Bloomfield Hills, Michigan
American male painters
Painters from Michigan
20th-century American painters
20th-century American male artists
Hungarian emigrants to the United States